
Year 369 BC was a year of the pre-Julian Roman calendar. At the time, it was known as the Year of the Tribunate of Fidenas, Cicurinus, Cossus, Cornelius, Cincinnatus and Ambustus (or, less frequently, year 385 Ab urbe condita). The denomination 369 BC for this year has been used since the early medieval period, when the Anno Domini calendar era became the prevalent method in Europe for naming years.

Events 
 By place 
 Greece 
 After driving off the Spartan army that has threatened Mantinea, Epaminondas of Thebes moves south and crosses the Evrotas River (the frontier of Sparta), which no hostile army has breached in historical memory. The Spartans, unwilling to engage the massive Theban army in battle, remain inside their city while the Thebans and their allies ravage Laconia.
 Epaminondas briefly returns to Arcadia, then marches south to Messenia, a territory which the Spartans had conquered some 200 years before. There, Epaminondas starts the rebuilding of the ancient city of Messene on Mount Ithome, with fortifications that are among the strongest in Greece. He then issues a call to Messenian exiles all over Greece to return and rebuild their homeland. The loss of Messenia is particularly damaging to the Spartans, since the territory comprises one-third of Sparta's territory and contains half of their helot population.
 On returning to Thebes, Epaminondas is put on trial by his political enemies who charge that he has retained his command longer than constitutionally permitted. While this charge is considered to be true, Epaminondas persuades the Thebans that this has been necessary to protect Thebes and its allies and reduce the power of Sparta. As a result, the charges against him are dropped.
 In a search for a balance of power against the now powerful Thebes, Athens responds to an appeal for help from Sparta and allies itself with its traditional enemy.
 On the death of the Macedonian King Amyntas III, his eldest son Alexander II becomes king. The young king is simultaneously faced with an Illyrian invasion from the north-west and an attack from the east by the pretender of the Macedonian throne, Pausanias (who quickly captures several cities and threatens the queen mother, Eurydice). Alexander defeats his enemies with the help of the Athenian general Iphicrates, who has been sailing along the Macedonian coast on the way to recapture Amphipolis.
 Alexander of Pherae becomes tyrant of Thessaly following the death of his father. Alexander's tyranny causes the Aleuadae of Larissa to seek the help of Alexander II of Macedon. Alexander II successfully gains control of Larissa and several other cities but, betraying a promise he has made, put garrisons in them. This provokes a hostile reaction from Thebes. The Theban general Pelopidas drives the Macedonians from Thessaly.
 Pelopidas forces Alexander to abandon his alliance with Athens in favour of Thebes by threatening to support Alexander's brother-in-law, Ptolemy of Aloros. As part of this new alliance, Alexander is compelled to hand over hostages, including his younger brother Philip, the future conqueror of Greece.
 Cleomenes II succeeds his brother Agesipolis II as Agiad king of Sparta.

Births 
Zhuang Zhou, Chinese Taoist philosopher

Deaths 
 Amyntas III, king of Macedonia
 Theaetetus, Athenian mathematician (b. c. 417 BC)
 Zhou Lie Wang, king of Zhou Dynasty

References